Kang Yun-gu (born 8 April 2002) is a Korean footballer currently playing as a midfielder for Busan IPark on loan from Ulsan Hyundai.

Career statistics

Club

Notes

References

2002 births
Living people
South Korean footballers
Association football midfielders
K League 1 players
K League 2 players
Ulsan Hyundai FC players
Busan IPark players
Footballers from Seoul